Luca Cei (born 7 May 1975 in Pietrasanta) is an Italian former racing cyclist.

Major results
1997
 1st La Popolarissima
1998
 1st Stage 12 Tour de Langkawi
9th Gran Premio della Costa Etruschi
1999
 1st Stage 12 Tour de Langkawi

References

1975 births
Living people
Italian male cyclists
Sportspeople from the Province of Lucca
Cyclists from Tuscany